

Review and events

The 2012–13 Swiss Super League began with a 0–2 loss against FC Sion. After this defeat the Grasshoppers remained unbeaten for twelve consecutive matches and goalkeeper Roman Bürki was able to set a new all-time record in keeping a clean sheet in Swiss football. He remained unbeaten for 659 minutes.

On May 20, 2013, the Grasshoppers won the 2012–13 Swiss Cup by a 5-4-victory on penalties against FC Basel. It was Grasshoppers 19th title in this competition and their first since 1994.

Matches

Legend

Friendly matches

Preseason

Mid-season (fall)

Winter break

Mid-season (spring)

Tournaments

3-Städte-Turnier Uster
Game duration 45 min

Tournament Horgen
Game duration 45 min

Hallenmasters 2013
Game duration 2x12 min (indoor tournament)

Super League

Kickoff times are in CET

League results and fixtures

League table

Results summary

Swiss Cup

Kickoff times are in CET

Squad

Squad, matches played and goals scored

Last updated: 2 June 2013

Note: Numbers in parenthesis denotes substitution appearances.

Players in italic left the club during the season

Transfers

Coaching staff

Sources

Grasshopper Club Zurich
Grasshopper Club Zürich seasons